William Thomas Sharkey (20 September 1873 – 15 May 1946) was an Australian rules footballer who played with Carlton in the Victorian Football League (VFL).

Notes

External links 
		
Bill Sharkey's profile at Blueseum

1873 births
1946 deaths
Australian rules footballers from Melbourne
Carlton Football Club players
People from North Melbourne